Brickellia extranea is a Mexican species of flowering plants in the family Asteraceae. It is native to western Mexico in the state of Jalisco.

References

extranea
Flora of Jalisco
Plants described in 1972